Orthogonius kapiriensis is a species of ground beetle in the subfamily Orthogoniinae. It was described by FFBurgeon in 1937.

References

kapiriensis
Beetles described in 1937